Hernán Rengifo Trigoso (born 18 April 1983) is a Peruvian footballer who plays as  a striker in the Peruvian Primera División for Asociación Deportiva Tarma.

Career
In a successful UEFA Cup campaign in 2008-09 for Lech Poznań, Rengifo finished with six goals in the competition, including scoring in both legs of Last 32 tie against Italian Serie A club Udinese Calcio. Hernan played at Lech along with fellow Peruvian, Anderson Cueto. Hernan made good successive performances in the Europe league, whilst at Lech Poznań.
In January 2010, he was transferred to Omonia in Cyprus. In January 2012, he was released from Omonia and returned to Peru, to play for Sporting Cristal.

International career
In March 2009, Rengifo was called up by coach José del Solar for the World Cup 2010 qualifiers with Chile and Brazil. The Peru team at this stage were bottom of the ten-nation qualifying group.

Rengifo was left behind as the national team returned from a match in Colombia on 10 June 2009.

Personal
He is nicknamed Charapa, which is how the people from the Amazonas basin is informally called in Peru. Literally, Charapa is the name of a turtle. In Poland he was nicknamed Reindeer - (Renifer in Polish).

Honours
Lech Poznań
Polish Cup: 2009
Polish SuperCup: 2009

Omonia
Cypriot Championship: 2010
Cypriot Cup: 2011
Cypriot Super Cup: 2010

Sporting Cristal
Torneo Descentralizado: 2012

International goals
Scores and results list Peru's goal tally first.

References

External links

lechpoznan.pl - Gallery:Medical treatment
video about Rengifo

1983 births
Living people
People from Chachapoyas Province
Peruvian footballers
Peruvian expatriate footballers
Peru international footballers
Club Universitario de Deportes footballers
Unión Huaral footballers
Club Deportivo Universidad de San Martín de Porres players
Lech Poznań players
AC Omonia players
Sporting Cristal footballers
Sivasspor footballers
Juan Aurich footballers
FBC Melgar footballers
Real Garcilaso footballers
Alianza Universidad footballers
Peruvian Primera División players
Ekstraklasa players
Süper Lig players
Cypriot First Division players
Association football forwards
Peruvian expatriate sportspeople in Poland
Peruvian expatriate sportspeople in Cyprus
Peruvian expatriate sportspeople in Turkey
Expatriate footballers in Poland
Expatriate footballers in Cyprus
Expatriate footballers in Turkey